I Ought to Be in Pictures (also promoted as Neil Simon's I Ought to Be in Pictures) is a 1982 American comedy-drama film directed by Herbert Ross and based on Neil Simon's 1980 play of the same name. The film stars Walter Matthau, Ann-Margret, and Dinah Manoff (the only cast member to reprise her Broadway role in the film). Other actors who have supporting roles are Lance Guest, Eugene Butler, David Faustino, Martin Ferrero and Michael Dudikoff.

The film was released on March 26, 1982, a year after the original broadway play ended and was filmed mainly in Los Angeles, California.

Plot

A 19-year-old Brooklynite, Libby Tucker is visiting her dead grandma's grave at a New York cemetery, and reveals that she is moving to Hollywood to become an actress and find her father, screenwriter Herbert Tucker. Libby takes a bus to Denver, then hitchhikes the rest of the way. She tries to call Herb, but gets nervous and hangs up.

The next morning, Libby goes to the house where Herb lives and meets his girlfriend, Steffy Blondell, who invites Libby inside. After becoming acquainted and learning the reason why Libby is in town, Steffy decides to leave. Herb awakens to find Libby after a 16-year gap in their lives. The two chat about their pasts, and Libby fills Herb in on the family he left behind, including her younger brother Robbie. The two eventually begin arguing about Libby's goal of becoming an actress. Just as Steffy returns, Libby runs out of the house.

Herb tracks down Libby at a motel and eventually persuades her to come back to live at his house. They begin to get along, although the high-strung Libby also begins to realize that Herb is not nearly as successful in Hollywood as she had assumed he was. He is also on the verge of losing Steffy, who has been asked on a date by another man and has been waiting a long time for Herb to make a commitment to her.

A studio makeup artist, Steffy helps Libby out by arranging for her go to a drama school. Libby meets a young man named Gordon there and together they take a part-time job doing valet parking at a celebrity-filled private party. Libby comes home at 3 a.m. and tells Herb about putting business cards on car windshields reading "Sunset Valet Parking. No party is too big or too small" on the front and "Libby Tucker, New York-Trained Actress. No part is too big or too small" on the back with her phone number included. Herb tells her that there is no chance of this helping her to become an actress, but Libby clings to her optimistic dreams.

Libby realizes more and more that her trip's true purpose was to reestablish a relationship with her father. She decides to return home. After packing up, Libby makes a long-distance phone call and gets Herbert to talk to her mother for the first time in 16 years. He speaks with her brother Robbie as well. Libby goes back home after taking Herb's picture for a keepsake. On the bus, she waves goodbye to Herb and Steffy, who appear to have worked out their differences.

Cast

Soundtrack
"One Hello" was performed at the end of the movie by Randy Crawford and written by Carole Bayer Sager and Marvin Hamlisch. An instrumental version of "One Hello" is heard at various points in the movie as well. Hamlisch composed the main music for the movie. Just nine months before the movie's premiere, "One Hello" was released on June 3, 1981 as Randy Crawford's single and it appeared in the album Windsong.

Filming and production
I Ought to Be in Pictures was originally produced for Broadway in 1980 and the original cast starred Ron Leibman as Herbert Tucker, Joyce Van Patten as Steffy and Dinah Manoff as Libby Tucker; as mentioned, Manoff was the only cast member to reprise her role in the movie. For the film version, most of the script from the play is the same with even more settings such as Dodger Stadium and the Hollywood Park Racetrack. The house used in the film was at 1761 Vista Del Mar Avenue, in Hollywood.

Reception
The film had an opening weekend gross of $2,170,397 in the United States. It would go on to make $6,968,359 in six weeks.

Gene Siskel and Roger Ebert selected the film as one of the worst of the year in a 1982 episode of Sneak Previews. Siskel's print review for the Chicago Tribune gave it 1.5 stars out of 4 and called it "another exercise in annoying manipulation from the one man who I wish wasn't in pictures." Vincent Canby of The New York Times wrote that "I found it unbearable. Being so mechanical, so slick and so sentimental, it is, at heart, heartless, and though it has the hyped up-pacing one associates with Broadway, it seems longer than 'Nicholas Nickelby.'" Kevin Thomas of the Los Angeles Times called the film "a largely satisfying reunion of Neil Simon, Walter Matthau and director Herbert Ross," adding, "The writing, the direction and the playing of Matthau and Ann-Margret represent the most effective way for Simon to get serious and still stay funny." Variety called it "a moving family drama, peppered with the author's patented gag lines and notable for sock performances by Dinah Manoff and Walter Matthau." David Ansen of Newsweek wrote, "Ross and Simon co-produced the movie, and they obviously think they're on the trail of psychological realism when in fact they're peddling dull, sentimental bromides. The payoff for the audience is a couple of supposedly heart warming moments, but it's hard to have a warm heart when your mind is sound asleep."

Home media
I Ought to Be in Pictures was released on VHS by CBS Fox Video on December 1, 1982. It was released on DVD on March 31, 2015.

References

External links

I Ought to Be in Pictures at cineplex.com

1982 films
1982 comedy-drama films
20th Century Fox films
American comedy-drama films
1980s English-language films
Films scored by Marvin Hamlisch
American films based on plays
Films about writers
Films based on works by Neil Simon
Films directed by Herbert Ross
Films shot in Los Angeles
Films set in Los Angeles
Films with screenplays by Neil Simon
1980s American films